Ataria Interpretation Centre is a wetlands interpretation centre and natural history museum for the Salburua wetlands, a Ramsar site and a significant wetlands habitat in the Basque Autonomous Community. The wetlands region is an important green belt on the eastern outskirts of the city of Vitoria - Gasteiz in Álava-Araba province. Ataria showcases the value of the wetlands, which are classified as a class 1 Habitat of European Community Interest, and the importance of biodiversity to Vitoria-Gasteiz's natural heritage. The Salburua marshes are considered to be "the Basque country's most valuable
area of wetland", according to a Fedenatur report for the European Commission in 2004.

Features
The centre complex was officially opened in July 2009, after three years of construction, at a cost of just under €7 million.

Building
The contemporary building was designed by QVE Arquitectos of Madrid, Spain. It was shortlisted for the World Architecture Festival in 2008 and nominated for the "Mies Arch Award" in 2009. Its construction is considered unique in that the building extends over the wetlands it examines. 100,000 visits to the centre were recorded in the first year of operation.

The building houses an auditorium, interactive exhibits, classrooms and laboratories for educational use, a café, and offices for the Vitoria-Gasteiz Centre for Environmental Studies.

Observation deck
The enclosed walkway deck was constructed of laminated veneer lumber and steel bar trusses. Concrete and steel anchors transfer the force to the ground. The structure was described as "singular" in a paper by Professor J. L. Fernández-Cabo, who compared it to the large cantilevered timber roof of a pavilion at Hanover fairgrounds.

References

External links 

 Official Ataria Interpretation Centre website
 QVE Arquitectos: Photographs and detailed description of construction by the architects

Nature centers
Museums in Vitoria-Gasteiz
Natural history museums in Spain